Hypochrosis cryptopyrrhata is a geometer moth in the subfamily Ennominae first described by Francis Walker in 1863. The species can be found in lowland and lower montane forests in Borneo and Sumatra.

The larvae feed on Paraserianthes falcataria (= Falcataria moluccana).

External links

Hypochrosini
Moths of Borneo
Moths described in 1863